A cello concerto is a concerto for solo cello with orchestra or, very occasionally, smaller groups of instruments.

Cello Concerto may also refer to:

 Cello Concerto (Albert), 1990
 Cello Concerto (Barber), 1945
 Cello Concerto (Bates), 2014
 Cello Concerto (Boccherini), 1760s–1770s
 Cello Concerto (Brahms), 1887
 Cello Concerto (Carter), 2001
 Cello Concerto (Delius), 1921
 Cello Concerto (Dvořák), 1894
 Cello Concerto (Elgar), 1919
 Cello Concerto (Finzi), 1955
 Cello Concerto (Glass), 2001
 Cello Concerto (Khachaturian), 1946
 Cello Concerto (Kraft), first published in 1805
 Cello Concerto (Lalo), 1876
 Cello Concerto (Ligeti), 1966
 Cello Concerto (Lutosławski), 1970
 Cello Concerto (MacMillan), 1996
 Cello Concerto (Margola), 1949
 Cello Concerto (Muhly), 2012
 Cello Concerto (Myaskovsky), 1945
 Cello Concerto (Panufnik), 1992
 Cello Concerto (Prokofiev), 1938
 Cello Concerto (Rorem), 2003
 Cello Concerto (Rouse), 1992
 Cello Concerto (Sallinen), a composition by Aulis Sallinen, 1976
 Cello Concerto (Salonen), 2017
 Cello Concerto (Schumann), 1950
 Cello Concerto (Stanford), a composition by Charles Villiers Stanford
 Cello Concerto (Sullivan), 1866
 Cello Concerto (Tchaikovsky/Leonovich), completed in 2006
 Cello Concerto (Thomson), 1950
 Cello Concerto (Walton), 1957
 Cello Concerto (Waterhouse), Op. 27, 1990
 Cello Concerto (Zwilich), 2020

See also
 Cello Concerto No. 1 (disambiguation)
 Cello Concerto No. 2 (disambiguation)
 Cello Concerto in A major (Dvořák), 1865
 Cello Concerto in D minor (Cassadó), 1926
 Cello Concerto in E major (Cassadó-Tchaikovsky)
 Cello (disambiguation)
 Concerto (disambiguation)
 Haydn Cello Concerto (disambiguation)